This was the first edition of the event.

Li Na won her maiden WTA singles title, defeating Martina Suchá in the final, 6–3, 6–4. Li also became the first Chinese player to win a WTA singles title.

Seeds

Draw

Finals

Top half

Bottom half

Qualifying

Seeds

Qualifiers

Qualifying draw

First qualifier

Second qualifier

Third qualifier

Fourth qualifier

References 

Guangzhou International Women's Open
2004 WTA Tour